Madagascaridia is a genus of proturans in the family Acerentomidae.

Species
 Madagascaridia condei Nosek, 1978
 Madagascaridia xizangensis Yin, 1983

References

Protura
Endemic fauna of Madagascar